Naan Rajavaga Pogiren is a 2013 Indian Tamil-language masala film written and directed by Prithvi Rajkumar. The film stars Nakul, Chandini Tamilarasan, and newcomer Avani Modi.

Plot 

Jeeva is a Tamil-speaking young man living with his mother in some obscure Himachal Pradesh village. He is naive and plays with kids twice as young as him. He has a sleeping disorder and dozes off in the middle of important things, viz. the climax of Dilwale Dulhaniya Le Jayenge. Jeeva would be a hard eight a book of weirdness. One day, a military serviceman mistakes him for a classmate named Raja from Chennai who looks just like him. After showing a few videos of Raja, he convinces Jeeva to leave behind his life in Himachal to go seek his lookalike. Most parts of the movie is basically Jeeva getting to know about Raja by talking to a person close to the latter. These people talk about Raja as they knew him. This results in a series of flashbacks which guide us and Jeeva on his search for Raja. We meet Raja's closest friend who has feelings for him. Through her, we go into another flashback and meet Valli who Raja had feelings for.

Cast 

 Nakul as Raja / Jeeva
 Chandini as Valli
 Avani Modi as Reema
 Dharmajan as Ronaldo
 Nishanth as Wahab
 A. Venkatesh as Isakkimuthu Annachi
 Gaurav Narayanan as Police Ravi
 Manivannan as Kamaraj
 Bobby Simha as Shankar Subramaniam
 Kasthuri as Professor Bharathi
 Suresh as Raja's father
 Seetha as Raja's mother
 Vanitha Vijayakumar as Dr. Diana
 Chetan as Diana's husband
 Delhi Ganesh as Kamaraj's assistant
 G. V. Kumar as Reema's father
 Boys Rajan as Valli's father
 Vasu Vikram as Raja's uncle
 Aarthi as Karate Durga
 Mayilsamy

Special appearances
 Zareen Khan as Item number Malgova
 Vetrimaaran
 G. V. Prakash Kumar
 Velraj
 Raaghav as a boxer

Production 
The shoot of the film began on 12 December 2011 at Sri Patalathri Narasimha Perumal Temple, Singaperumal Koil .

Soundtrack 

The soundtrack, composed by G. V. Prakash Kumar, was released on 14 December 2012 at Sathyam Cinemas by Ameer Sultan and Dhanush. Apart from the cast and crew, Vasanthabalan, Gaurav, Sivakarthikeyan, Jithan Ramesh, Vanitha Vijayakumar, Sriman, Dhananjayan were among those present. Musicperk.com rated the album 5.5/10 quoting "GV misses the bus".

Release 
The satellite rights of the film were sold to Raj TV.

Critical reception 
Baradwaj Rangan wrote, "Not-bad fare for masala movie fans". Behindwoods wrote:"Naan Rajavaga Pogiren is an ambitious effort, by a promising new comer, but with a less gripping screenplay". Sify stated  On the whole, it is well-worn, formulaic fare that might appeal to viewers who find comfort in the familiar. If you have time go for it, as it is not entirely unwatchable.

References

External links 
 

2010s action adventure films
2010s Tamil-language films
2013 directorial debut films
2013 films
Indian action adventure films
Indian nonlinear narrative films
2013 masala films
Films scored by G. V. Prakash Kumar